The 45th Los Angeles Film Critics Association Awards, given by the Los Angeles Film Critics Association (LAFCA), honored the best in film for 2019.

Winners

Best Film:
Parasite
Runner-up: The Irishman
Best Director:
Bong Joon-ho – Parasite
Runner-up: Martin Scorsese – The Irishman
Best Actor:
Antonio Banderas – Pain and Glory
Runner-up: Adam Driver – Marriage Story
Best Actress:
Mary Kay Place – Diane
Runner-up: Lupita Nyong'o – Us
Best Supporting Actor:
Song Kang-ho – Parasite
Runner-up: Joe Pesci – The Irishman
Best Supporting Actress:
Jennifer Lopez – Hustlers
Runner-up: Zhao Shu-zhen – The Farewell
Best Screenplay:
Noah Baumbach – Marriage Story
Runner-up: Bong Joon-ho and Han Jin-won – Parasite
Best Cinematography:
Claire Mathon – Atlantics and Portrait of a Lady on Fire
Runner-up: Roger Deakins – 1917
Best Editing:
Todd Douglas Miller – Apollo 11
Runner-up: Ronald Bronstein and Benny Safdie – Uncut Gems
Best Production Design:
Barbara Ling – Once Upon a Time in Hollywood
Runner-up: Ha-jun Lee – Parasite
Best Music Score:
Dan Levy – I Lost My Body
Runner-up: Thomas Newman – 1917
Best Foreign Language Film:
Pain and Glory • Spain
Runner-up: Portrait of a Lady on Fire • France
Best Documentary/Non-Fiction Film:
American Factory
Runner-up: Apollo 11
Best Animation:
I Lost My Body
Runner-up: Toy Story 4
New Generation Award:
Jimmie Fails, Jonathan Majors, and Joe Talbot – The Last Black Man in San Francisco
Career Achievement Award:
Elaine May
The Douglas Edwards Experimental/Independent Film/Video Award:
Ja'Tovia Gary – The Giverny Document

References

2019
Los Angeles Film Critics Association Awards
Los Angeles Film Critics Association Awards
Los Angeles Film Critics Association Awards
Los Angeles Film Critics Association Awards